Noerr (named Nörr Stiefenhofer Lutz before 2010) is a pan-European full-service law firm headquartered in Munich, Germany. Founded in 1950, the firm today operates 15 offices in Germany, Central and Eastern Europe, Spain, the United Kingdom and the United States. Noerr currently employs over 500+ lawyers, tax consultants, chartered accountants and business consultants.  Noerr is ranked as the second largest independent German law firm by revenue, behind Hengeler Mueller, making it the sixth-largest European law firm by revenue.

International connections 
Noerr is a German member of Lex Mundi, an association of independent law firms, with more than 160 member firms worldwide. The firm also provides multicultural BRIC Desks which operate out of its German offices.

Recognition and awards 

Recent awards and accolades for Noerr include:
European Law Firm of the Year (The Lawyer European Awards 2012)
Law Firm of the Year for Banking & Finance; Restructuring; and Distribution (JUVE Awards 2012)
Client Service Law Firm of the Year (Chambers Europe Awards for Excellence 2012 & 2010)
ILO Client Choice Award for Germany (International Law Office 2012 & 2011)
"Highly commended" International Law Firm of the Year (Legal Business Awards 2012)
Ranked among the top four of Germany’s most popular legal employers in the latest azur100 top employer survey for young lawyers (azur 100 Magazine 2012)
Best German Law Firm (International Legal Alliance Summit & Awards 2011, 2010 & 2009)
Finalist for the European Law Firm of the Year Award (British Legal Awards 2011)
M&A Law Firm of the Year and Dispute Resolution Law Firm of the Year (JUVE Awards 2010)*
Litigation Law Firm of the Year in Germany (Global Law Experts Awards 2010)

References

External links 
 
 Chambers & Partners Guide to World's Leading Lawyers (Europe)
 Noerr on Twitter

Law firms of Germany
Law firms established in 1950
Foreign law firms with offices in the United States